A Veblen good is a type of luxury good for which the demand increases as the price increases, in apparent (but not actual) contradiction of the law of demand, resulting in an upward-sloping demand curve. The higher prices of Veblen goods may make them desirable as a status symbol in the practices of conspicuous consumption and conspicuous leisure. A product may be a Veblen good because it is a positional good, something few others can own.

Background 
Veblen goods are named after American economist Thorstein Veblen, who first identified conspicuous consumption as a mode of status-seeking (i.e., keeping up with the Joneses) in The Theory of the Leisure Class (1899). The testability of this theory was questioned by Colin Campbell due to the lack of complete honesty from research participants. However, research in 2007 studying the effect of social comparison on human brains can be used as an evidence supporting Veblen. The idea that seeking status can be an incentive to spend was also later discussed by Fred Hirsch.

Additionally, there have been different arguments on whether Veblen’s theory applies only to luxury goods or all goods.

Analysis 

A corollary of the Veblen effect is that lowering the price may increase the demand at first, but will decrease the quantity demanded afterwards.

The following concepts can explain the existence of Veblen goods:

 Pecuniary emulation (or pecuniary success), which leads to invidious comparison (or invidious distinction).
 Relative consumption trap.
 The inverse relationship between one’s well-being with another’s income.
 The suppression of explicit attempts to emphasize social status differences.

The theory of Veblen good made a significant contribution towards marketing and advertising. There are multiple studies considering Veblen goods as a tool to develop and maintain a strong relationship with consumers.

While Veblen goods are more affordable for high income households and affluent societies are usually known as the targeted income groups of Veblen brands, they have been experiencing a trend away from conspicuous consumption.

Ethical concerns 
Being aware of the existence of Veblen goods, concerns were raised regarding their wastefulness  as they are viewed as deadweight loss. Consuming Veblen goods also results in other financial and social consequences such as conspicuous demonstration of unequal wealth distribution  and the need to adjust tax formulas. Another negative outcome is that this type of consumption can be a culprit of the future exacerbation of pollution.

Nonetheless, one exception is ethical consumers interested in virtue signaling through their consumption of goods and services. Veblen goods targeting this market segment must also be ethically manufactured to increase in their quantity demanded.

Related concepts 

The Veblen effect is one of a family of theoretical anomalies in the general law of demand in microeconomics. Related effects include:

 The snob effect: expressed preference for goods because they are different from those commonly preferred; in other words, for consumers who want to use exclusive products, price is quality.
 The common law of business balance: the low price of a good indicates that the producer may have compromised quality, that is, "you get what you pay for".
 The hot-hand fallacy: stock buyers have fallen prey to the fallacy that previous price increases suggest future price increases. Other rationales for buying a high-priced stock are that previous buyers who bid up the price are proof of the issue's quality, or conversely, that an issue's low price may be evidence of viability problems.

Sometimes, the value of a good increases as the number of buyers or users increases. This is called the bandwagon effect when it depends on the psychology of buying a product because it seems popular, or the network effect when a large number of buyers or users itself increases the value of a good. For example, as the number of people with telephones or Facebook accounts increased, the value of having a telephone or Facebook account increased because the user could reach more people. However, neither of these effects suggests that raising the price would boost demand at a given level of saturation.

Some of these effects are discussed in a 1950 article by economist Harvey Leibenstein. Counter-examples have been called the counter-Veblen effect.

The effect on demand depends on the range of other goods available, their prices, and whether they serve as substitutes for the goods in question. The effects are anomalies within demand theory, because the theory normally assumes that preferences are independent of price or the number of units being sold. They are therefore collectively referred to as interaction effects.

Interaction effects are a different kind of anomaly from that posed by Giffen goods. The Giffen goods theory is one for which observed quantity demanded rises as price rises. Still, the effect arises without any interaction between price and preference—it results from the interplay of the income effect and the substitution effect of a price change.

See also 
 Choice-supportive bias
 Consumer surplus
Normal good
Inferior good
Easterlin paradox

References 

Consumer theory
Goods (economics)
Institutional economics
good, Veblen